Sykkylvsbladet (The Sykkylven Gazette) is a local Norwegian newspaper published in Sykkylven in Møre og Romsdal county.

The paper mostly covers the municipality of Sykkylven. It appears twice a week, on Wednesdays and Fridays, and is published in Nynorsk. The paper is edited by Frank Kjøde and it is printed by Edda Trykk Nordvest AS.

Circulation
According to the Norwegian Audit Bureau of Circulations and National Association of Local Newspapers, Sykkylvsbladet has had the following annual circulation:
2004: 2,756
2005: 2,792
2006: 2,833
2007: 2,937
2008: 2,980
2009: 3,017
2010: 3,026
2011: 2,971
2012: 2,975
2013: 2,927
2014: 2,856
2015: 2,797
2016: 2,718

References

External links
Sykkylvsbladet homepage

Newspapers published in Norway
Norwegian-language newspapers
Sykkylven
Mass media in Møre og Romsdal
Publications established in 1946
1946 establishments in Norway
Nynorsk